Jitney Jungle was a chain of supermarkets that began in Jackson, Mississippi, in 1919. It was a private Forbes 500 company and one of the largest privately held grocery store chains in the United States. It was acquired by Winn-Dixie in 2000.

Origins
Originally, brothers Judson McCarty Holman and William Henry Holman and their cousin William Bonner McCarty founded a grocery store in Jackson, Mississippi, in 1912. Over the next few years, they opened additional stores, but in 1916, one of their stores found itself unable to collect the amounts owed by some of its customers, and the idea of changing over to a cash-and-carry business model began to take root. While W. H. Holman was away serving in World War I, his brother and cousin decided to change over to cash-and-carry, and after he returned from the war, they opened the first Jitney Jungle on East Capitol Street in Jackson on 19 April 1919.

The three patented the Jitney Jungle concept in 1920, but were soon hit with a patent infringement lawsuit brought by Piggly Wiggly. To disprove the infringement allegations, Will McCarty made a trip west and found cash-and-carry stores there, which contradicted Piggly Wiggly's assertion that it had originated the idea. The Supreme Court found in Jitney Jungle's favor.

The chain gradually expanded across Mississippi and into neighboring states, eventually ending up with stores as far away as Florida. In 1973, the chain had 38 grocery stores, six gasoline stations, and five drugstores, and by 1992, Jitney Jungle had over 100 stores.

In the 1960s, a convenience store subsidiary, Jr. Food Mart, was formed. All the Jr. Food Mart stores sold gasoline and groceries. The subsidiary is still in operation. Many of the stores have fast service restaurants featuring Creole Fried Chicken. Jr. Food Mart operates convenience stores in Alabama, Mississippi and Louisiana, and formerly operated locations in Arkansas as well.  In 1965, Jitney made the most important step of the decade by joining Topco, a national, cooperatively owned purchasing association that wielded as much purchasing power as the largest supermarket chains.  The move made it possible for Jitney to purchase grade-A foodstuffs and related merchandise at competitive prices.

Jitney Fresh Markets, a grocery chain in Southern California is not related to the former Jitney Jungle Stores of America.

Decline and bankruptcy
In the mid-90s the family sold Jitney Jungle to New York investment firm Bruckmann, Rosser, Sherrill & Co. for $400 million. By the end of 90’s, the chain had become debt-ridden from mismanagement, and its ill-advised 1997 acquisition of Delchamps. In 2000, Winn-Dixie acquired Jitney Jungle and Delchamps, and rebranded the stores to Winn-Dixie.

In 2005, Winn-Dixie closed many stores, including most of its stores in Mississippi that had previously been Jitney Jungle stores. Some of these stores remain closed, with no particular prospects of being acquired and reopened. Others have taken on new lives.

The chain's store on East Fortification Street in Jackson, still known to many Jacksonians as "Jitney 14," remains open today as part of a relatively new local grocery chain called McDade's, which also owns former Jitney stores on Duling Avenue in the Woodland Hills area of Jackson and most recently the former Jitney which closed after Winn-Dixie's departure on Ellis Avenue in Westland Plaza Shopping Center.

The oldest among the Jitney stores still in operation are the Fondren store and the old Jitney 14 on East Fortification. The Fondren Jitney store started in the mid-to-late 19th century as a David's Fondren Grocery. It later operated as an A&P Food Store, a Jitney Jungle, and most recently a Winn-Dixie. The original David's Fondren Grocery is no longer in business but the commercial center it started still operates today as a member of McDade's Market.

Another store that recently reopened this year is the old "Jitney Jungle # 4" at 311 West Northside Drive in Jackson. This store was closed by Jitney Jungle on February 18, 2000 and soon after became part of the New Deal Supermarket chain based in Jackson, which was owned by former Jitney District Supervisor Kenneth Leakes. This store was closed in 2005 by New Deal as part of its plan to divest under-performing stores. This store was never sold; it was reopened in 2007 as a Grocery Warehouse type store under New Deal's plan to rebuild the company. This location was never remodeled and still sits today with the old Jitney Jungle decor design inside and out.

Jitney owned and operated under the brands Jitney Jungle, Jitney Premier, Sack & Save, MegaMarket, Delchamps and Pump & Save.

Name
There has been much local speculation about where the odd-sounding name "Jitney Jungle" came from. One legend has it that when the first store placed its first advertisement in a local newspaper, the store called itself the "Jitney Jingle" -- "jitney" was a slang word for a nickel, and the idea was that when you came out of the store, the nickels would still be jingling in your pocket because you'd saved so much money. But the newspaper, the story goes, fumbled the name of the store into "Jitney Jungle," and it stuck. However, this explanation was rejected by W. H. Holman, Jr., a member of the family who started Jitney Jungle. In his 1973 address to the Mississippi Committee of the Newcomen Society of the United States in Jackson, Holman said:

How did they get the name, Jitney-Jungle? The naming process began during a Sunday dinner at the home of Judge V. J. Stricker, a close friend of the families. The "Jitney" in the title was a popular name for the cut-rate five-cent taxis of that day, many of which were operated by returning veterans. It would be jitneys that would carry many of the cash customers to the store and back. Jitney was also a slang term for a nickel. That fitted in with the "nickel on a quarter" that the customer would save by patronizing the self-service store. Also, a popular expression of that time had to do with "jingling your jitneys in your pockets." Thus, Judge Stricker ventured the name Jitney-Jingle. There is a legend that "Jingle" got to be "Jungle" by virtue of a printer's error in the first advertisement. Rather it was a play on words by Mr. Will McCarty. Every Jitney would be a jungle of bargains that could save the customer a "jitney" on a quarter.

References

Other sources
History of Jitney Jungle from before the company's demise

Defunct supermarkets of the United States
Retail companies established in 1919
Retail companies disestablished in 2000
Defunct companies based in Mississippi